Elizabeth Louise "Beth" Storry (born 24 April 1978) is an English field hockey goalkeeper. She was part of the British teams that won the bronze medal at the 2012 Olympics and placed sixth in 2008.

Storry is lesbian. She lives with her partner in Utrecht and works as a business manager with Nike, Inc. She is an accomplished baker, and in 2014 appeared in the Dutch version of The Great British Bake Off TV show, Heel Holland Bakt.

References

External links
 

1978 births
Living people
English female field hockey players
Female field hockey goalkeepers
Olympic field hockey players of Great Britain
Field hockey players at the 2006 Commonwealth Games
Field hockey players at the 2008 Summer Olympics
Commonwealth Games bronze medallists for England
Sportspeople from Reading, Berkshire
Olympic medalists in field hockey
Olympic bronze medallists for Great Britain
Field hockey players at the 2012 Summer Olympics
Medalists at the 2012 Summer Olympics
Commonwealth Games medallists in field hockey
LGBT field hockey players
SCHC players
Reading Hockey Club players
HC Rotterdam players
21st-century English LGBT people
Medallists at the 2006 Commonwealth Games